Barbara J. Good (born c. 1920) was an Irish badminton player.

Biography
Barbara J. Good was the daughter of badminton players Dr T. D. Good and Ada Good. Two of her siblings also played badminton at national and international level, Derreen and Norman. Good won her first national titles in Ireland in 1948. By 1954, she had been successful nine times. In 1952 she won the Irish Open. She played in mixed doubles with Jim FitzGibbon, and went on numerous badminton tournament tours with FitzGibbon, Dorothy Donaldson, and Frank Peard.

Achievements

References

1920s births
Date of death unknown
Irish female badminton players